The 2019–20 season was Derby County's twelfth consecutive season in the Championship in their 136th year in existence. Along with competing in the Championship, the club also participated in the FA Cup and the EFL Cup. The season covered the period from 1 July 2019 to 22 July 2020.

This season was the first for manager Phillip Cocu, after the previous manager Frank Lampard left on 4 July 2019 to become head coach at Premier League club Chelsea.

After a poor first half of the season saw Derby in 17th and just seven points clear of relegation, the arrival of Wayne Rooney saw a galvanised Derby side lose just three of their sixteen games after the New Year and just three points off the playoff positions with just five games remaining. However a run of four straight defeats - all against teams occupying the top six - ended any hopes of a third consecutive playoff campaign as they finished six points behind Swansea City in 6th. The 10th-placed finish, and a return of 64 points, was Derby's worst league performance since the 2012–13 season, when they also finished 10th but achieved just 61 points.

Review

Pre-season
The Derby squad reported back for pre-season training on 1 July, with uncertainty remaining over the future over Frank Lampard, who was excused from attending training to undergo talks with Chelsea about their vacant managerial position. With speculation over Lampard's future, Phillip Cocu was installed as favourite to replace Lampard, with former Ram Darren Moore, Lincoln City's Darren Cowley, Derby Academy boss Darren Wassall, Chris Hughton and Wycombe Wanderers manager Gareth Ainsworth also rumoured. Lampard was officially appointed as Chelsea's head coach on 4 July, after just one year at Derby and Phillip Cocu was confirmed as his replacement the next day, becoming the first foreign manager in the club's 136-year history. Following Cocu's arrival, and with the new season just a month away, Derby were given promotion odds of 11/2, putting them as ninth-favourite.

Pre-season preparations began with a 10-day training camp at the IMG Academy in Bradenton, Florida. A 2–0 victory over local USL League Two side Sarasota Metropolis was followed by a match with fellow EFL Championship side Bristol City, which was abandoned at half-time due to extreme weather conditions, with the Rams trailing 1–0. The match was rearranged for the following day and played over two, 30-minute halves, with the Derby winning 2–0. Derby returned to England to round off their pre-season preparations with a 5–2 victory at Burton Albion in the Bass Vase, and 1–0 defeats to Segunda División side Girona and Scottish Premiership side Glasgow Rangers.

Following their failure to gain promotion the previous campaign, Derby set about reshaping the squad with three first team players, former club-record signing Bradley Johnson, Nick Blackman and Jacob Butterfield, leaving the club to join Blackburn Rovers, Maccabi Tel Aviv. and Luton Town
 respectively. Three players joined the club, Everton midfielder Kieran Dowell and Brighton & Hove Albion defender Matthew Clarke on season-long loans, with the sole permanent signing being Arsenal's Krystian Bielik for a potential club-record fee.

August
Derby started the season with a 2–1 victory away to recently relegated Huddersfield Town, with the result itself coming against a backdrop of rumours that Manchester United and England all-time leading scorer Wayne Rooney was on his way to the club on a player-coach deal. The deal was confirmed the following day, with Rooney signing a deal which would see him join the club following the end of the MLS season on a £100k-a-week deal, which would be partly subsidised by club-sponsor  32Red. The end of the transfer window on 8 August saw Derby sign Huddersfield Town goalkeeper Ben Hamer and Bristol City's Jamie Paterson on loan, with Scott Carson leaving on loan for Manchester City.

Friendlies

Pre-season
In June 2019. The Rams announced their pre-season schedule.

Mid-season
On 14 June 2020, ahead of the season's resumption following the enforced break during the COVID-19 pandemic, Derby County played two friendlies at Pride Park against fellow EFL Championship side Stoke City. The club had previously played an inter-squad friendly at Pride Park Stadium on 9 June 2020.

Competitions

Championship

League table

Results by matchday

Result summary

Matches
On Thursday, 20 June 2019, the EFL Championship fixtures were revealed. Fixture dates and kick-off times are subject to change due to televised games.

On 13 March 2020, all professional football fixtures in the United Kingdom, including those of Derby County, were postponed until at least 3 April 2020 due to the ongoing COVID-19 pandemic. On 19 March 2020, this postponement was extended until at least 30 April 2020.

FA Cup

The third round draw was made live on BBC Two from Etihad Stadium, Micah Richards and Tony Adams conducted the draw. Derby County were drawn away to Premier League side Crystal Palace. The fourth round draw was made by Alex Scott and David O'Leary on Monday, 6 January.

EFL Cup

The first round draw was made on 20 June. The second round draw was made on 13 August 2019 following the conclusion of all but one first round matches.

Statistics

Appearances and goals

|-
! colspan=14 style=background:#dcdcdc; text-align:center| Goalkeepers

|-
! colspan=14 style=background:#dcdcdc; text-align:center| Defenders

|-
! colspan=14 style=background:#dcdcdc; text-align:center| Midfielders

|-
! colspan=14 style=background:#dcdcdc; text-align:center| Forwards

|}

Goal scorers

Assists record

Transfers

Transfers in

Loans in

Loans out

Transfers out

References

Derby County
Derby County F.C. seasons